Medina High School or Medina Secondary School is a public high school located in Medina, Texas (USA), classified as a 1A school by the UIL. It is part of the Medina Independent School District serving students in central Bandera County. 

In 2012, Medina High School was ranked 9th in Children at Risk's Top 10 High Schools in Greater San Antonio. In 2013, the school was rated "Met Standard" by the Texas Education Agency.

Athletics
The Medina Bobcats compete in the following sports 

Baseball
Basketball
Cross Country
Golf
Football
Softball
Tennis
Track and Field
Volleyball

State Titles
Boys Cross Country 
1997(1A)

References

External links
Medina ISD

Schools in Bandera County, Texas
Public high schools in Texas
Public middle schools in Texas